Eskimo Kisses (foaled February 26, 2015) is an American Thoroughbred racehorse who won the 2018 Alabama Stakes.

Career

Eskimo Kisses was foaled on February 26, 2015. Eskimo's first race was on November 25, 2017 at Keeneland Racecourse, where she finished 2nd.

Eskimo won her first race on February 1, 2018 at Oaklawn Park. She followed that up with a 2nd win on February 22.

Eskimo's next and highest grade win came on August 18, 2018 when she won the 2018 Alabama Stakes.

Pedigree

References

2015 racehorse births
American racehorses
Racehorses bred in Kentucky
Racehorses trained in the United States
Thoroughbred family 23-b